Going To California is an American dramedy television series created for Showtime and airing from 2001 to 2002. It starred Sam Trammell and Brad William Henke as Kevin "Space" Lauglin and Henry "Hank" Ungalow, two friends on a road trip across the United States. The show focused on what happened to Hank and Space during their stops and detours along the way to California. John Mallory Asher played the recurring character Insect Bob and also served as a director. The tag line was: "No map. No plan. No rules. No turning back."

Guest stars included Lindsay Sloane, Jenny McCarthy (John Asher's then wife), David Faustino, Jaime Pressly, Vince Vaughn, Stacey Dash, Rosanna Arquette and Jerry O'Connell.

It was cancelled in 2002 after 20 episodes despite a positive critical response, and despite a cult following it has never been issued on DVD. In 2007 creator Scott Rosenberg returned with the show October Road, which was loosely based on Going To California; Evan Jones reprised his role as Ikey and a new actor played Eddie Latekka, two characters from the original show, while Brad William Henke and Sean Gunn played new characters. The character Baggo was also referenced, but unseen. The town of Bishop Flats was featured in both shows.

Cast
Sam Trammell as Kevin 'Space' Lauglin
Brad William Henke as Henry 'Hank' Ungalow

Episodes

References

External links
 

2000s American comedy-drama television series
Showtime (TV network) original programming
Television series by Sony Pictures Television
2001 American television series debuts
2002 American television series endings
English-language television shows
Television shows set in the United States